United Nations Security Council resolution 1204, adopted unanimously on 30 October 1998, after reaffirming all previous resolutions on the question of the Western Sahara, the Council extended the mandate of the United Nations Mission for the Referendum in Western Sahara (MINURSO) until 17 December 1998.

The Security Council reiterated its commitment to finding a lasting solution to the conflict in Western Sahara and its determination to hold a referendum on self-determination for the people of the territory in accordance with the Settlement Plan which both Morocco and the Polisario Front had accepted.

Both parties were requested to allow the United Nations High Commissioner for Refugees (UNHCR) to conduct preparatory work for the repatriation of Saharan refugees eligible to vote. Additionally they were asked to agree to a package of measures concerning the appeals process, the role of the UNHCR and the future stages of the Settlement Plan by mid-November 1998. The resolution regretted that the technical support unit was still not fully operational and called for the conclusion of a Status of Forces Agreement which would facilitate the deployment of military units in Western Sahara. It supported the intention of MINURSO to publish the voter lists by 1 December 1998 and an increase in staff at the Identification Commission from 18 to 25 as well as necessary support personnel.

See also
 Free Zone (region)
 History of Western Sahara
 List of United Nations Security Council Resolutions 1201 to 1300 (1998–2000)
 Sahrawi Arab Democratic Republic
 Moroccan Western Sahara Wall

References

External links
 
Text of the Resolution at undocs.org

 1204
1998 in Morocco
 1204
 1204
October 1998 events
1990s in Western Sahara